Robert Risko (born November 11, 1956, in Ellwood City, Pennsylvania) is an American caricature artist known for his retro airbrush style. Risko's style embodies the spirit of the 1930s Vanity Fair caricaturists Miguel Covarrubias and Paolo Garretto, the latter of which he corresponded with until Garretto's death in 1989.

Career 
Risko began his career by following in the footsteps of his mentor Andy Warhol and moved to New York City from Pittsburgh. He started drawing celebrity portraits for Warhol's Interview magazine. Risko's hard-edged airbrush style was an instant hit. Risko was influenced by the shiny aesthetic of the 1970s and the Art Deco revival taking place in New York City at the time. Risko recalls, "New York was a petrie dish of creativity back then, with people like Mapplethorpe and Madonna pushing the envelope. It was an amazing time to be starting out then."
 
At 25, Risko was chosen by renowned art director Bea Feitler along with Rolling Stone photographer Annie Leibovitz and artist Keith Haring to define the look of the new Vanity Fair when the magazine was relaunched in 1983. He has been a contributor ever since and has been instrumental in not only shaping Vanity Fair's unique look by contemporizing the spirit of the Bauhaus with his style but revealing personality traits of his subjects by reducing them to their essence with a few stylized colored shapes.

In addition to Vanity Fair, Risko's work is published regularly in many major magazines, including The New Yorker, Rolling Stone, Playboy, Esquire, and Interview, and was seen on VH1's Pop 200 Icons Countdown. He illustrated the packaging for the Capitol Sings composer series, and HBO's Comedy Club video series. 

Risko divides his time between New York City and East Hampton, New York. He is currently working on a children's book. He has also been published in books such as Fame (1979), Fame II (1981), and The Risko Book, published by the Monacelli Press  in 2000, which collected 180 of his pieces. His latest book is Vanity Fair's Proust Questionnaire: 101 Luminaries Ponder Love, Death, Happiness, and the Meaning of Life (Rodale, 2009).

In October 2017, the Kennedy Center held an exhibition of Risko's work that he had created for the Mark Twain Prize for American Humor, an activity that he has done since 2002.

References

External links
 

1956 births
Living people
People from Ellwood City, Pennsylvania
Kent State University alumni
American caricaturists
Vanity Fair (magazine) people